Wenceslaus Werlin (died 1780) was an Austrian painter. Werlin specialized in portraits and was active in Turin. He died in Florence in 1780.

References

1780 deaths
18th-century Austrian painters
18th-century Austrian male artists
Austrian male painters
Year of birth unknown